Elachanthemum is a genus of Asian plants in the chamomile tribe within the daisy family.

Species
The only known species is Elachanthemum intricatum. native to Mongolia and to China (Gansu, Nei Mongol, Ningxia, Qinghai, Xinjiang).

References

Monotypic Asteraceae genera
Flora of China
Flora of Mongolia
Anthemideae